Akai Foods, Inc. is a multinational fishery company headquartered in the Philippines, specializing in farming, processing, and exporting a variety of seafood.

Established in 1986, the family-run company is a member of Philippine Exporters Confederation and the Association of Food Manufacturers and Exporters of Cebu. The company is a supplier internationally, with ties throughout China, the United States, Eastern Europe, and South America.

The company's main facilities are in Mandaue in Cebu province, in close proximity to the Port of Cebu. Akai Foods currently has a network of hundreds of fishers and affiliate traders under its operation. Products include seaweed, abalone, squid, cuttlefish, shellfish, parrot fish, tuskfish, fried fish fingers, lobster balls, and fish oil.

See also 

 Fish farm
 Fish processing
 List of seafood companies

References

External links 

 Akai Foods, Inc.

Fish farming companies
Food and drink companies of the Philippines

Seafood companies of Asia